Exton Square Mall is a shopping mall located in the Exton, Pennsylvania in West Whiteland Township in Chester County, Pennsylvania. The mall features a parking garage and food court. It is located at the crossroads of Chester County at the intersection of U.S. Route 30 Business and Pennsylvania Route 100. The mall is anchored by Macy's and Boscov's retail stores and a Round One Entertainment, an arcade and bowling center. It also contains dozens of smaller stores and a food court.

The Exton Square Mall is shaped as a square with the southern half of the mall two floors and the northern half one floor. Macy's is located at the center of the mall while the other two anchor stores and the food court are on corners of the mall. It is owned by Pennsylvania Real Estate Investment Trust (PREIT).

Location

The Exton Square Mall is located in the unincorporated community of Exton in West Whiteland Township, Chester County, Pennsylvania at the northeast corner of the intersection between east-west US 30 Bus. and north-south PA 100. The intersection between US 30 Bus. and PA 100 is known as "the crossroads of Chester County". The mall is located near the US 30 bypass of Exton, the US 202 expressway, and the Pennsylvania Turnpike. Southeastern Pennsylvania Transportation Authority (SEPTA) bus routes 135 and 204 stop at the mall at the Exton Transportation Center, providing access to West Chester, Coatesville, Eagleview, and Paoli. The mall is also near the Exton station that is served by the Paoli/Thorndale Line of SEPTA Regional Rail and Amtrak's Keystone Service and Pennsylvanian. The Exton Square Mall has a market area that covers most of Chester County along with the western portion of Delaware County, the western portion of Montgomery County near Pottstown, the extreme southern portion of Berks County, and the extreme eastern portion of Lancaster County.

History
The Exton Square Mall was built by The Rouse Company and opened its doors in March 1973. The mall had one anchor store, Strawbridge & Clothier, surrounded by a ring of smaller stores. It was also home to Pennsylvania's first Chick-fil-A restaurant which opened in 1973 and is part of the food court today. In developing the Exton Square Mall, The Rouse Company was responsible for restoring the Zook House, a historic 18th century farmhouse that existed at the site of the mall.

By the 1990s, the mall, which had no major renovations, was starting to show its age, leading to plans for expansion. In 1992, the mall proposed adding two anchor stores. In 1995, plans were made by The Rouse Company to expand the Exton Square Mall, in which the size of the mall would be doubled. The Rouse Company purchased 12 acres near the mall to be used for the expansion. Boscov's and JCPenney signed leases to open locations at the Exton Square Mall in 1996 with Sears following in 1997. In September 1997, West Whiteland Township supervisors approved the expansion of the Exton Square Mall.

Groundbreaking for the expansion took place in December 1997. In 1998, the Zook House, which had served as the mall management office, was relocated to make way for the new Boscov's store. The expansion added three new anchor stores, a new food court, two parking garages, and a completed second level. The expanded mall was designed to reflect the agricultural heritage of Chester County. In addition to expanding the mall, The Rouse Company improved US 30 Bus. and PA 100 near the mall at a cost of $3 million. Boscov's, Sears, and the new food court opened in 1999. Construction concluded in May 2000 with the opening of JCPenney and 48 new stores; a grand reopening was held to commemorate this. The expansion of the mall cost $125 million. The expansion turned the Exton Square Mall into the first regional mall in Chester County.

In 2003, The Rouse Company sold the Exton Square Mall along with the Cherry Hill Mall, Echelon Mall, Moorestown Mall, Plymouth Meeting Mall, and The Gallery at Market East to PREIT for $548 million. In 2005, Federated Department Stores purchased May Department Stores, the owners of Strawbridge's, and planned to convert several Strawbridge's locations to Macy's, including the store at Exton Square Mall. Strawbridge's became Macy's in 2006. In January 2014, Main Line Health opened a  healthcare facility on the first floor.

On January 15, 2014, it was announced that the JCPenney store would be closing as part of a plan to close 33 locations nationwide. With the closure of JCPenney, PREIT announced plans to reposition the Exton Square Mall. As part of the redevelopment, PREIT would take over the Kmart outparcel in 2016. On July 29, 2015, PREIT announced that they would demolish the Kmart outparcel and replace it with Whole Foods Market. Whole Foods Market opened on January 18, 2018. In addition, Round One Entertainment opened a bowling and entertainment center in the first floor of the former JCPenney on December 9, 2016.  In 2017, the Sears Auto Center closed.  On July 14, 2019, it was announced that the Sears store would also be closing.  The store closed in September 2019. On May 13, 2021, a COVID-19 vaccination clinic opened in the former Sears building.

In 2019, the non-anchor occupancy rate at Exton Square Mall was 65.1%. Many of the stores in the mall are non-traditional tenants such as medical offices, a chess club, an art studio and gallery, and a chamber of commerce office. In Spring 2022, Toys R Us will open on the lower level of Macy's.

It was announced on March 15, 2022 that PREIT will sell the Exton Square Mall to raise money to pay down their debt.

Stores and facilities
The Exton Square Mall contains three anchor stores. Sears closed in September 2019. There is also a  anchor spot used by Round One Entertainment since 2016. It originally opened as JCPenney 2000 as part of the mall expansion, but closed in 2014. Round One only occupies the lower level and the upper level remains vacant.

In addition to the anchor stores, the mall has dozens of smaller stores. The mall also contains a food court with 13 spaces. The mall is shaped as a square, with the first floor looping around the southern half of the mall and the second floor looping around the whole mall. Macy's is located in the center of the square, with the former Sears at the northwest corner, the food court at the northeast corner, Boscov's at the southwest corner, and Round One Entertainment at the southeast corner.

The Exton Square Mall complex also contains several facilities including the Chester County Library at Exton, the Exton Transportation Center with connections to the King of Prussia mall, and medical facilities.  The Main Line Health at Exton Square is located within the mall between Macy's and Boscov's.  The design of the facility is similar to buildings where physician practices are grouped together.

Economic impact
The opening of the Exton Square Mall coincided with rapid growth in West Whiteland Township, with the population increasing from 7,900 in 1973 to over 16,000 by 2000. Since the opening, many shopping centers and office parks have been built in the township.  Following the opening of the mall, the West Whiteland Township Police Department was created to patrol the township as the demand from the mall would be too much for the Pennsylvania State Police to handle. When the Exton Square Mall first opened, several stores in downtown West Chester closed. In 2011, the Exton Square Mall saw sales per square foot of $332.

In popular culture
On September 10, 2015, director Kevin Smith announced that the Exton Square Mall would be used in the filming of MallBrats, the sequel to his 1995 film Mallrats. MallBrats was originally intended to be filmed at the Granite Run Mall, but the plan fell through due to that mall's impending demolition. In February 2017, plans for filming MallBrats were cancelled.

Gallery

References

External links

 Exton Square Mall
 Pennsylvania Real Estate Investment Trust

Shopping malls in Pennsylvania
Shopping malls established in 1973
Tourist attractions in Chester County, Pennsylvania
Buildings and structures in Chester County, Pennsylvania
Pennsylvania Real Estate Investment Trust